University of Santo Tomas–General Santos City (abbreviated as UST-GenSan) is a private, Catholic higher education institution in General Santos, Philippines. The UST General Santos is the first UST Campus in Visayas and Mindanao. It is an extension campus of the University of Santo Tomas in Manila.

Its buildings and facilities are still under construction as of 2022. The main building of the University of Santo Tomas campus in General Santos (GenSan) is expected to be completed in 2023.

History
The University of Santo Tomas (UST) in Manila acquired land in barangays Ligaya and Katangawan in General Santos in 1997, intending to establish an extension campus in the city. However development of the campus was delayed due to land classification issues. The site was classified as agricultural until 2013, when it was reassigned as institutional land.

Full development of the UST General Santos campus began with the groundbreaking ceremony held in April 2018. Laying of the foundations began in November 2020 and on December 4, 2021, the Topping-Off Ceremony was held on the view deck. According to Facilities Management Office Director Fr. Dexter A. Austria, O.P., SThD, the next year and a half will be spent performing the architectural, electrical, and mechanical works in the edifice.

UST-GenSan was projected to be operational by 2021, but the opening date was pushed to 2023.

Campus
Its main building will be six-storey high which is fronted by an open plaza. It will have a 100-person capacity chapel, library, clinic, org rooms, an auditorium, and function halls. It will also have a football pitch and an athletics oval.

Colleges
UST-GenSan will have the following academic units.
School of Business and Accountancy
School of Engineering and Technology
School of Health Sciences
School of Pharmacy and Pharmaceutical Sciences

See also
University of Santo Tomas in Manila
University of Santo Tomas–Legazpi
University of Santo Tomas–Sta Rosa

References

Catholic universities and colleges in the Philippines
Schools in General Santos
Buildings and structures under construction in the Philippines